Natasha Braier (born December 11, 1974) is an Argentinian cinematographer. She resides in Los Angeles, California.

Biography
A Buenos Aires native, Braier is the daughter of two Freudian psychoanalysts. She earned a master's degree in cinematography at the National Film and Television School. Her film credits include Glue, XXY, Somers Town, The Rover. At the 2009 Manaki Brothers Film Festival, she won the Golden Camera 300 award for her work on The Milk of Sorrow. At the 2017 Robert Awards, she won the Robert Award for Best Cinematography for her work on The Neon Demon. At the 2019 Sundance Film Festival, she won the Special Jury Award for Vision and Craft for her work on Honey Boy.

Filmography

References

External links
 
 

1974 births
Living people
Argentine cinematographers
Argentine women cinematographers
People from Buenos Aires